Jezebel was the daughter of Ithobaal I of Tyre and the wife of Ahab, King of Israel, according to the Book of Kings of the Hebrew Bible.

According to the biblical narrative, Jezebel, along with her husband, instituted the worship of Baal and Asherah on a national scale. In addition, she violently purged the prophets of Yahweh from Israel, damaging the reputation of the Omride dynasty. For these offences, the Omride dynasty was annihilated, with Jezebel herself suffering death by defenestration.

Later, in the Book of Revelation, Jezebel is symbolically associated with false prophets.

Meaning of name
Jezebel is the Anglicized transliteration of the Hebrew  . The Oxford Guide to People & Places of the Bible states that the name is "best understood as meaning 'Where is the Prince?, a ritual cry from worship ceremonies in honor of Baal during periods of the year when the god was considered to be in the underworld. Alternatively, a feminine Punic name noted by the Corpus Inscriptionum Semiticarum, 𐤁𐤏𐤋𐤀𐤆𐤁𐤋 b'l'zbl, may have been a cognate to the original form of the name, as the Israelites were known to often alter personal names which invoked the names of foreign gods (cf. instances for Baal, Mephibosheth and Ish-bosheth).

Biblical account

Jezebel is introduced into the biblical narrative as a Phoenician princess, the daughter of Ithobaal I, king of Tyre ( says she was "Sidonian", which is a biblical term for Phoenicians in general).
According to genealogies given in Josephus and other classical sources, she was the great-aunt of Dido, Queen of Carthage. As the daughter of Ithobaal I, she was also the sister of Baal-Eser II. Jezebel eventually married King Ahab of Samaria, the northern kingdom of Israel.

Near Eastern scholar Charles R. Krahmalkov proposed that Psalm 45 records the wedding ceremony of Ahab and Jezebel, but other scholars cast doubt on this association. This marriage was the culmination of the friendly relations existing between Israel and Phoenicia during Omri's reign, and possibly cemented important political designs of Ahab. Jezebel, like the foreign wives of Solomon, required facilities for carrying on her form of worship, so Ahab made a Baalist altar in the house of Baal, which he had built in Samaria. Geoffrey Bromiley points out that it was Phoenician practice to install a royal woman as a priestess of Astarte, thus she would have a more active role in temple and palace relations than was customary in the Hebrew monarchy.

Elijah

Her coronation as queen upset the balance of power between Yahwism and Baalism. As a worshiper of Baal, Jezebel had significant power and influence, which she used to both support Baal's cultus and eliminate its rivals, using methods that the Bible describes in brutal terms. Obadiah, a pro-Yahwist figure in Ahab's royal court, secretly protected the survivors of these purges in a cave.

As a result, Elijah invited Jezebel's prophets of Baal and Asherah to a challenge at Mount Carmel. The challenge was to see which god, Yahweh or Baal, would burn a bull sacrifice on an altar. Jezebel's prophets failed to summon Baal in burning the bull sacrifice, despite their cries and cutting themselves. Elijah, however, succeeded when he summoned Yahweh, impressing the Israelites. He then ordered the people to seize and kill the prophets of Baal and Asherah at the Kishon River. After the prophets were slain, Jezebel swore to have Elijah become like her prophets (i.e. killed), even if it meant embracing divine judgement upon herself if she failed to do so. Elijah fled for his life to the wilderness, where he mourned the devotion of Israel to Baal and lamented being the only Yahwist worshiper left.

Naboth
After an unspecified amount of time had passed, since Ahab was notably rebuked by an unnamed prophet for letting Ben-Hadad survive (Ben-Hadad planned to capture Ahab's "wives", including Jezebel, as plunder after besieging Samaria), he visited Naboth's residence. The residence was located near the royal palace in the city of Jezreel. Wishing to acquire Naboth's vineyard so that he could expand his own gardens, Ahab asked to purchase Naboth's vineyard in exchange for a better quality vineyard or financial compensation. Naboth declined, which he justified by informing Ahab that his vineyard was ancestral property. Ahab returned to his palace, sullen and depressed by Naboth's response. Jezebel decided to console him by arranging for Naboth to be entrapped and later executed on the (false) charges of blasphemy against God and the king. After Naboth was executed outside the city, his corpse was licked by stray dogs. Jezebel then informed Ahab that he could seize Naboth's vineyard. 

Elijah condemned Ahab for committing theft and murder. As punishment, God decreed Ahab's death and the annihilation of his royal line. Jezebel's death was also decreed, with her corpse to be devoured by dogs.

Death

Three years later, Ahab died in battle. His son Ahaziah inherited the throne, but died as the result of an accident and Ahaziah was succeeded by his brother, Joram. Elisha, Elijah's successor, commanded one of his disciples to anoint Jehu, commander of Joram's army, as king, to be the agent of divine punishment against Ahab's family. Jehu killed Joram, and his nephew Ahaziah (the king of Judah and son of Athaliah, who was possibly the daughter of Jezebel). He later approached the royal palace in Jezreel to confront Jezebel.

Knowing that Jehu was coming, Jezebel put on make-up and a formal wig with adornments and looked out of a window, taunting him. Bromiley says that it should be looked at less as an attempt at seduction than the public appearance of the queen mother, invested with the authority of the royal house and cult, confronting a rebellious commander. In his two-volume Guide to the Bible (1967 and 1969), Isaac Asimov describes Jezebel's last act: dressing in all her finery, make-up, and jewelry, as deliberately symbolic, indicating her dignity, royal status, and determination to go out of this life as a queen.

Jehu later ordered Jezebel's eunuch servants to throw her from the window. Her blood splattered on the wall and horses, and Jehu's horse trampled her corpse. He entered the palace where, after he ate and drank, he ordered Jezebel's body to be taken for burial. His servants discovered only her skull, her feet, and the palms of her hands—her flesh had been eaten by stray dogs, just as the prophet Elijah had prophesied. Edwin R. Thiele dates Jezebel's death .

Historicity

According to Israel Finkelstein, the marriage of King Ahab to the daughter of the ruler of the Phoenician empire was a sign of the power and prestige of Ahab and the northern Kingdom of Israel. He termed it a "brilliant stroke of international diplomacy". He says that the inconsistencies and anachronisms in the biblical stories of Jezebel and Ahab mean that they must be considered "more of a historical novel than an accurate historical chronicle". Among these inconsistencies, 1 Kings 20 states that "Ben-Hadad king of Aram" invaded Samaria during Ahab's reign, but this event did not take place until later in the history of Israel. The two books of Kings are part of the Deuteronomistic history, compiled more than two hundred years after the death of Jezebel. Finkelstein states that these accounts are "obviously influenced by the theology of the seventh century BCE writers". The compilers of the biblical accounts of Jezebel and her family were writing in the southern kingdom of Judah centuries after the events and from a perspective of strict monolatry. These writers considered the polytheism of the members of the Omride dynasty to be sinful. In addition, they were hostile to the northern kingdom and its history, as its center of Samaria was a rival to Jerusalem. According to Dr J. Bimson, of Trinity College, Bristol 1 and 2 Kings are not "a straightforward history but a history which contains its own theological commentary". He points to verses like  that show the author of Kings was drawing on other earlier sources.

A seal from the 9th century BCE, discovered in 1964, has a partially damaged inscription of "YZBL" which could have once read, "belonging to Jezebel". However, there are some issues with this theory. Whereas on the seal it appears the inscription begins with the letter yodh, Jezebel's name starts with an aleph, which is lacking on the seal; furthermore, the possessive lamedh which would translate to the predicate "belonging to ..." is also missing from the seal. However, it is entirely possible these letters simply could have been located where the seal is now damaged. The seal includes motifs associated with both Egyptian and Israelite royalty, such as the Uraeus cobra which is commonly found on pharaonic artifacts, and symbols such as the winged sun and Ankh, which are found on numerous other Israelite royal seals from the 8th century BCE and onwards. Regardless, scholars do not agree on whether the seal is evidence for the historicity of the biblical character. Some scholars have said that the size and intricacy of the seal could mean it was used by royalty.

Cultural symbol

According to Geoffrey Bromiley, the depiction of Jezebel as "the incarnation of Canaanite cultic and political practices, detested by Israelite prophets and loyalists, has given her a literary life far beyond the existence of a ninth-century Tyrian princess."

Through the centuries, the name Jezebel came to be associated with false prophets. By the early 20th century, it was also associated with fallen or abandoned women. In Christian lore, a comparison to Jezebel suggested that a person was a pagan or an apostate masquerading as a servant of God. By manipulation and seduction, she misled the saints of God into sins of idolatry and sexual immorality. In particular, Christians associated Jezebel with promiscuity. The cosmetics which Jezebel applied before her death also led some Christians to associate makeup with vice. In the Middle Ages, the chronicler Matthew Paris criticised Isabella of Angoulême, the queen consort of John, King of England, by writing that she was "more Jezebel than Isabel". In modern usage, the name of Jezebel is sometimes used as a synonym for sexually promiscuous or controlling women. The Jezebel stereotype is an oppressive image and was used as a justification for sexual assault and sexual servitude during the eras of colonization and slavery in the United States.

In feminist interpretations and Bible scholarship, Jezebel is re-examined and, for example, seen as unfairly framed (McKinlay, cited in Bellis) or her story falsified (Beach) or as a resource for womanist theology (Lomax).

In popular culture

In literature
Beach, Eleanor Ferris. The Jezebel Letters: religion and politics in ninth-century Israel. Fortress Press, 2005.
Bellis, Alice Ogden. Helpmates, harlots, and heroes: Women's stories in the Hebrew Bible. Westminster John Knox Press, 2007.
Everhart, Janet S. "Jezebel: Framed by eunuchs?." The Catholic Biblical Quarterly 72, no. 4 (2010): 688-698.
Garrett, Ginger. "Reign: The Chronicles of Queen Jezebel", Book #3 in the Lost Loves of the Bible Series (2013), 
Hazleton, Lesley. "Jezebel: The Untold Story of the Bible's Harlot Queen" (2009)
Jackson, Melissa. "Reading Jezebel from the "other" side: Feminist critique, postcolonialism, and comedy." Review & Expositor 112, no. 2 (2015): 239-255.
Lomax, Tamura. Jezebel unhinged: Loosing the Black female body in religion and culture. Duke University Press, 2018.
Mokoena, Lerato. "Reclaiming Jezebel and Mrs Job: Challenging Sexist Cultural Stereotypes and the Curse of Invisibility" in Transgression and transformation: Feminist, postcolonial and queer Biblical interpretation as creative interventions (2021).
Quick, Catherine S. "Jezebel's last laugh: the rhetoric of wicked women." Women and Language 16, no. 1 (1993): 44-49.
Snyder, J.B., 2012. Jezebel and her Interpreters. Women's Bible Commentary: Twentieth–Anniversary Edition. Louisville, KY, pp.180-183.
Wyatt, Stephanie. "Jezebel, Elijah, and the widow of Zarephath: A ménage à trois that estranges the holy and makes the holy the strange." Journal for the Study of the Old Testament 36, no. 4 (2012): 435-458.

References

External links
 

840s BC deaths
1st-millennium BC executions
9th-century BC deaths
9th-century BC Phoenician people
9th-century BC women
Ancient princesses
Biblical murderers
Biblical murder victims
Female murder victims
Female murderers
Monarchs of the Hebrew Bible
Idolatry
Murdered royalty
Omrides
People executed by defenestration
People from Sidon
Queens consort of Israel and Judah
Women in the Hebrew Bible
Year of birth unknown
Baal
Massacres in the Bible
Whore of Babylon
Phoenicians in the Hebrew Bible